Aga Lesiewicz has lived in London for more than thirty years and has been a radio presenter, voice-over artist, interpreter, screenwriter and a TV producer and director during a varied career. A serious knee injury in 2013 forced another change in career, prompting her to write her first book Rebound. Exposure (Pan Macmillan, 2017) is her second novel. She is currently working on her third London-based psychological thriller.

Bio
Daughter of Maria Ciesielska and Witold Lesiewicz.

References

External links

represented by gregoryandcompany 
panmacmillan rebound
panmacmillan Aga Lesiewicz

Year of birth missing (living people)
Living people
Exophonic writers
Writers from London
British thriller writers